Rosemary Edghill (born 1956) is an American writer and editor. Some of her work has appeared under her original name, eluki bes shahar (lower case intentional).  Her primary genres are science fiction and fantasy, but she began by writing Regency romance novels.

Career

The publishers of her first novel felt that "Eluki Bes Shahar" (her legal name at the time) sounded insufficiently English to attract readers, so she adopted the pen-name Rosemary Edghill, which became her legal name in 2004. Her sister, a reference librarian, writes as India Edghill.

She cites some of her influences:

Too many to count. Damon Runyon and Mark Twain, for use of language. C. L. Moore and Eric Frank Russell, ditto. For storybuilding and sheer artfulness, John Le Carre. For language (again!) Margaret Atwood. For a great story, which is the First Thing in my book, John D. MacDonald, Peter O'Donnell, Ian Fleming, Leslie Charteris, Raymond Chandler, Dashiell Hammett (and we're back to the language thing again). Kipling. Poe. Clark Ashton Smith. Robert E. Howard. Robert A. Heinlein. Lovecraft. For that matter, I think I owe as much to the great editors of SF's silver age as to the writers, so here's to you: John W. Campbell, Groff Conklin, and Damon Knight.

Edghill has collaborated in writing fiction with Andre Norton, Mercedes Lackey, and Marion Zimmer Bradley. Her books with Andre Norton include Shadow of Albion and Leopard in Exile. Her books with Mercedes Lackey include Spirits White as Lightning and Mad Maudlin.

Edghill lives in upstate New York with cats and King Charles Spaniels. She trains and shows her dogs in obedience competitions.

Bibliography 

According to WorldCat, her bibliography is as follows:

Regency Romances 
 Turkish Delight (1987)
 Two of a Kind (1988)
 The Ill-Bred Bride (1990)
 Fleeting Fancy (1993)

Hellflower series 
The Hellflower series features Butterfly St Cyr, a female starpilot trying to make a living as a tramp cargo hauler, as she befriends Valijon Starbringer (or, as Butterfly calls him, "Tiggy Stardust") a teenage hellflower (slang for a mercenary) who is totally out of his depth.
 Hellflower (1991) (reprinted in 2022 by Ring of Fire Press)
 Darktraders (1992) (reprinted in 2022 by Ring of Fire Press)
 Archangel Blues (1993) (reprinted in 2022 by Ring of Fire Press)
The three were collected in: Butterfly and Hellflower (1993); hardcover, omnibus ed., 640 pages, published by New York Guild America Books

Bast series 
The Bast series features an amateur female detective who is a New York City Wiccan. They were collected in Bell, Book, and Murder.
 Speak Daggers to Her (1994) 
 Book of Moons (1995)
 The Bowl of Night (1996)

The Twelve Treasures 
 The Empty Crown (SFBC Omnibus Edition of the three "Twelve Treasures" novels)(1997)
 The Sword of Maiden's Tears (1994)
 The Cup of Morning Shadows (1995)
 The Cloak of Night and Daggers (1997)

Others 
 King's Quest VI: Heir Today, Gone Tomorrow novelization (1992), in The King's Quest Companion. 
 Smoke and Mirrors (1997) (not to be confused with Smoke and Mirrors (2005) by Tanya Huff)
 Met by Moonlight (1998) 
 The Warslayer (2002)
 Vengeance of Masks  (2003)
 Paying the Piper at the Gates of Dawn and Other Stories (2003)

 with Marion Zimmer Bradley
 Ghostlight (1995)
 Witchlight (1996)
 Gravelight (1997)
 Heartlight (1998)
 with Tom DeFalco

 Time's Arrow: The Future (X-Men & Spider-Man #3) (1998)

 with Andre Norton
 The Shadow of Albion (Carolus Rex, Bk 1) (1999)
 Leopard in Exile (Carolus Rex, Bk 2) (2001)

 with Mercedes Lackey 
 Beyond World's End (2001) 
 Spirits White as Lightning (2001) 
 Mad Maudlin (2003)
 Bedlam's Edge (2005)
 Music to My Sorrow (Bedlam's Bard) (2005)
Dead Reckoning (2012)

 The Shadow Grail series
 Legacies (2010)
 Conspiracies (2011)
 Sacrifices (2013)
 Victories (2014)

Short fiction
 "The Ever-After" in Dragon Magazine (1989) and anthologized in A Dragon-Lover's Treasury of the Fantastic (1994)
 "Child of Ocean" in Dragon Magazine (1991)
 "Is Your Coworker a Space Alien?" (1994)		
 "The New Britomart" (1995)
 "To Light Such a Candle" (1995)

References

External links
 
 

1956 births
Living people
20th-century American novelists
21st-century American novelists
American fantasy writers
American science fiction writers
American women short story writers
American women novelists
Women science fiction and fantasy writers
20th-century American women writers
21st-century American women writers
20th-century American short story writers
21st-century American short story writers